Griffith Glacier is a tributary glacier draining westward from Beacon Dome, the California Plateau and the Watson Escarpment in Antarctica to enter Scott Glacier between Mount McKercher and Mount Meeks. It was mapped by the United States Geological Survey from surveys and U.S. Navy air photos, 1960–63, and was named by the Advisory Committee on Antarctic Names for Lieutenant Commander Philip G. Griffith, an aircraft commander on photographic flights during Operation Deep Freeze 1966 and 1967.

References

Glaciers of Marie Byrd Land